Friedrich Kauffmann (14 September 1863 – 14 July 1941) was a German philologist who specialized in Germanic studies.

Biography
Friedrich Kaufmann was born in Stuttgart, Germany on 14 September 1863. Kaufmann enrolled at the University of Tübingen in 1881, where he studied classical philology under Alfred von Gutschmid and Erwin Rohde, and Germanic philology under Eduard Sievers. He received his Ph.D. in 1886 with a thesis on the Old Saxon poem Heliand. During the work for his thesis, Kauffmann came in contact with Hermann Paul, who was to have a major impact on his future career.

Kaufmann gained his habilitation at Marburg in 1887 with a thesis on the Swabian dialect. He was appointed an associate professor at the Martin Luther University of Halle-Wittenberg in 1892, and subsequently became a full professor at the University of Jena. From 1895 to 1928, Kauffmann was Chair of German Philology at the University of Kiel, where he served as Rector from 1904 to 1905. Kauffmann retired from Kiel in 1928, and died in Berlin on 14 July 1941. 

Kauffmann specialized in Germanic studies. He was considered an expert on early Germanic literature, Germanic religion, and Germanic Antiquity, on which he authored a number of works. He was an advocate of interdisciplinary research, and sought to use philological, archaeological and historical evidence in his research. He played an instrumental role in paving the way for archaeological excavations at Hedeby. He was the father of art historian Hans Kauffmann.

Selected works
 *'Der Vokalismus des Schwäbischen in der Mundart von Horb, 1887
 Geschichte der schwäbischen Mundart: Im Mittelalter und in der Neuzeit. Mit Textproben und einer Geschichte der Schriftsprache in Schwaben, 1890
 (Publisher) Aus der Schule des Wulfila. Auxenti Dorostorensis epistula de fide vita et obitu Wulfilae im Zusammenhang mit der Dissertatio Maximini contra Ambrosium, 1899
 Balder: Mythos und Sage ; nach ihren dichterischen und religiösen Elementen untersucht'', 1902

See also
 Rudolf Much

Sources

External links
 Friedrich Kauffmann in the OPAC of Regesta Imperii

1863 births
1943 deaths
German philologists
Germanists
Germanic studies scholars
People from Stuttgart
Academic staff of the Martin Luther University of Halle-Wittenberg
Academic staff of the University of Jena
Academic staff of the University of Kiel
University of Tübingen alumni
Writers on Germanic paganism